Wanda K. Denson-Low (born 1958) is the former senior vice president of the office of internal governance at The Boeing Company. In 1989, while working at Hughes Aircraft Company, she became the first minority woman to become a patent counsel at a Fortune 500 company. She is vice president of the Rensselaer Polytechnic Institute board of trustees.

Early life and education 
Denson-Low grew up in St. Albans, Queens. She is half Japanese and half African-American. She studied chemistry at Rensselaer Polytechnic Institute, graduating in 1978. She went on to earn her Juris Doctor at Brooklyn Law School in 1981. She practises law in California and Connecticut. She established the Wanda Denson Low and Ronald Low scholarship for outstanding members of the Asian Pacific American Community.

Career 
From 1981 Denson-Low worked as a patent attorney at Union Carbide. She became a trainee patent attorney in 1984. In 1985 she joined Hughes Aircraft Company. As a senior lawyer at Hughes, Denson-Low mentored patent attorneys from minority groups. She became the nation's first minority women chief patent counsel for a Fortune 500 company in 1989. She managed a $14.4 million budget.

She was the first minority woman to become vice president at Hughes Aircraft Company in 1992. She joined the Boeing legal team in October 2000. She was awarded a silver anniversary award from the Los Angeles Black Women Lawyer's Association for her services to the community.

She worked as vice president for Human Resources for the Defense and Space when Hughes Aircraft Company was acquired by Boeing in 2000. She was made Boeing's Vice President and Assistant General Counsel. She became Vice President of Integrated Defense Systems (IDS) in 2003.

Denson-Low was appointed to the Boeing executive council in 2007. She was made Senior Vice President of the Office of Internal Governance in 2011. She retired in 2014. She joined the Rensselaer Polytechnic Institute Board of Trustees in 2016. She is on the board of the Japanese American National Museum.

Awards 

 Pioneer Award from Black Engineer of the Year (2011) 
 Organization of Chinese Americans National Asian Pacific American Corporate Achievement Award
 NOW Legal Defense and Education Fund Award
 Anti-Defamation League of Los Angeles Deborah Award
 National Asian Pacific American Bar Association Law Foundation Women Leadership Award (2004)

References 

Living people
1958 births
Boeing people
Rensselaer Polytechnic Institute alumni
People from Queens, New York
Brooklyn Law School alumni
California lawyers
Connecticut lawyers
20th-century American businesspeople
20th-century American businesswomen
21st-century American businesspeople
21st-century American businesswomen
American women business executives
American aerospace businesspeople
American people of Japanese descent
African-American women lawyers
African-American lawyers
African-American business executives
20th-century African-American women
20th-century African-American people
21st-century African-American women
21st-century African-American people